Portsmouth Langstone was a borough constituency in Portsmouth.  It returned one Member of Parliament (MP) to the House of Commons of the Parliament of the United Kingdom, elected by the first past the post system.

History 

The constituency was created for the 1950 general election, and abolished for the February 1974 general election.

Boundaries
1950–1955: The County Borough of Portsmouth wards of Cosham and Meredith, and the Urban District of Havant and Waterloo.

1955–1974: The County Borough of Portsmouth wards of Cosham, Farlington, Meredith, and Paulsgrove, and the Urban District of Havant and Waterloo.

Members of Parliament

Election results

References

Parliamentary constituencies in Hampshire (historic)
Constituencies of the Parliament of the United Kingdom established in 1950
Constituencies of the Parliament of the United Kingdom disestablished in 1974
Politics of Portsmouth